Talca Province is one of four provinces of the central Chilean region of Maule (VII).  Its capital is the city of Talca.

Administration
As a province, Talca is a second-level administrative division of Chile, governed by the regional delegate of Maule Region who is appointed by the president.

Communes
The province comprises ten communes, each governed by a municipality consisting of an alcalde and municipal council.

 Talca
 San Clemente
 Pelarco
 Pencahue
 Maule
 San Rafael
 Curepto
 Constitución
 Empedrado
 Río Claro

Geography
To the east the Andean slopes cover a considerable part of its territory, and in the west another large area is covered by the Chilean Coast Range. Between these is the central valley of Chile. The mountainous parts are well wooded, and the intermediate plain, which is rolling and slopes gently to the south, is fertile.

Demography
Between the 1992 and 2002 censuses, the population grew by 12.4% (39,015 persons).

References

Provinces of Maule Region
 01
Provinces of Chile